

A

B

C

D

E

F

G-O
List of places in Colorado G through O

P-Z
List of places in Colorado P through Z

References